T.I.P. is the second independent album by rapper Young Buck. It was released on November 8, 2005, through the independent label, Mass Appeal Entertainment. Guest appearances on the album include D-Tay, Rizin Sun, First Born and Bun B.

The album was recorded before Young Buck signed with G-Unit in 2002, but it was not released until after his 2004 solo debut album, Straight Outta Cashville.

Reception
T.I.P. sold more than 26,000 copies in its first week of release to debut at number 40 on the Billboard 200 albums chart. 
It also reached number 11 on the Top R&B/Hip-Hop Albums chart.

Stylus Magazine writer Evan McGarvey criticized the album's "meager" production values, and he noted that "Young Buck’s charms are alluring, if a little unrefined." 
McGarvey praised Young Buck for knowing "even then that two rappers make a song intrinsically different than one voice. That in itself is a lesson most rappers seldom learn as rookies." 
Steve Juon of RapReviews wrote that opening track "Blood in Blood Out" sounded similar to Young Buck's later work, providing the album with a "fairly promising" start. 
However, Juon added that "too much of this album is just plain mediocre", and that its release was an obvious attempt "to cash in on Buck's fame."

Track listing

All lyrics by Young Buck, music compositions listed below.

Credits
Mastering
Eric Conn
Don Cobb

Mixing
Eric Schilling

Design
Blake Franklin

Performers
Young Buck
Rizin' Sun
Smoov Jizzell
D-Tay
First Born
Bun B

Chart performance

References

2005 albums
Young Buck albums
Demo albums